John F. Wood Jr. (born January 13, 1936) is a Democratic American politician who represented District 28B from 1987 to 1994 and District 29A from 1995 to 2015 in the Maryland House of Delegates.

Early life
John F. Wood Jr. was born on January 13, 1936, in Leonardtown, Maryland. He attended Charlotte Hall Military Academy and served in the Maryland National Guard as a sergeant from 1952 to 1960.

Career
Wood was the owner and operator of Wood's Food Rite from 1962 to 1993. Wood has worked as a partner for Cross and Wood Insurance Brokers since 1993.

In the legislature
Wood served as a member of the Maryland House of Delegates for 28 years (1987 to 2015). He served as a Democrat. He represented District 28B from 1987 to 1994. He then represented District 29A from 1995 to 2015. In his time he served on the House Appropriations and Legislative Policy Committees and its public safety, administration, and personnel oversight subcommittees.

Woods acted as the Chair of the Commerce and Government Matters Committee from 1999–2003 and the chair of the Joint Committee on Administrative, Executive and Legislative Review, 2003-0.

Legislative notes
Voted against the Clean Indoor Air Act of 2007 (HB359)

Personal life
Wood is married with nine children.

References

Living people
1936 births
Democratic Party members of the Maryland House of Delegates
Charlotte Hall Military Academy alumni
21st-century American politicians